Malvales is an order of flowering plants. As circumscribed by APG II-system, the order includes about 6000 species within 9 families. The order is placed in the eurosids II, which are part of the eudicots. The plants are mostly shrubs and trees; most of its families have a cosmopolitan distribution in the tropics and subtropics, with limited expansion into temperate regions. The morphology of Malvales is diverse, with few common characteristics. Among those most commonly encountered are palmate leaves, connate sepals, and a specific structure and chemical composition of the seeds. The cortex is often fibrous, built of soft phloem layers.

The anthophytes are a grouping of plant taxa bearing flower-like reproductive structures. They were formerly thought to be a clade comprising plants bearing flower-like structures.  The group contained the angiosperms - the extant flowering plants, such as roses and grasses - as well as the Gnetales and the extinct Bennettitales.

23,420 species of vascular plant have been recorded in South Africa, making it the sixth most species-rich country in the world and the most species-rich country on the African continent. Of these, 153 species are considered to be threatened. Nine biomes have been described in South Africa: Fynbos, Succulent Karoo, desert, Nama Karoo, grassland, savanna, Albany thickets, the Indian Ocean coastal belt, and forests.

The 2018 South African National Biodiversity Institute's National Biodiversity Assessment plant checklist lists 35,130 taxa in the phyla Anthocerotophyta (hornworts (6)), Anthophyta (flowering plants (33534)), Bryophyta (mosses (685)), Cycadophyta (cycads (42)), Lycopodiophyta (Lycophytes(45)), Marchantiophyta (liverworts (376)), Pinophyta (conifers (33)), and Pteridophyta (cryptogams (408)).

Six families are represented in the literature. Listed taxa include species, subspecies, varieties, and forms as recorded, some of which have subsequently been allocated to other taxa as synonyms, in which cases the accepted taxon is appended to the listing. Multiple entries under alternative names reflect taxonomic revision over time.

Balanophoraceae
 Family: Balanophoraceae,

Mystropetalon
Genus Mystropetalon:
 Mystropetalon thomii Harv. endemic

Sarcophyte
Genus Sarcophyte:
 Sarcophyte sanguinea Sparrm. indigenous
 Sarcophyte sanguinea Sparrm. subsp. sanguinea, indigenous

Cistaceae
 Family: Cistaceae,

Cistus
Genus Cistus:
 Cistus ladanifer L. not indigenous, cultivated, naturalised

Cytinaceae
 Family: Cytinaceae,

Cytinus
Genus Cytinus:
 Cytinus capensis Marloth, endemic
 Cytinus sanguineus (Thunb.) Fourc. endemic
 Cytinus visseri Burgoyne, indigenous

Malvaceae
 Family: Malvaceae,

Abelmoschus
Genus Abelmoschus:
 Abelmoschus esculentus (L.) Moench var. esculentus, not indigenous, naturalised

Abutilon
Genus Abutilon:
 Abutilon angulatum (Guill. & Perr.) Mast. indigenous
 Abutilon angulatum (Guill. & Perr.) Mast. var. angulatum, indigenous
 Abutilon angulatum (Guill. & Perr.) Mast. var. macrophyllum (Baker f.) Hochr. indigenous
 Abutilon austro-africanum Hochr. indigenous
 Abutilon dinteri Ulbr. indigenous
 Abutilon englerianum Ulbr. indigenous
 Abutilon flanaganii A.Meeuse, endemic
 Abutilon fruticosum Guill. & Perr. indigenous
 Abutilon galpinii A.Meeuse, indigenous
 Abutilon grandiflorum G.Don, indigenous
 Abutilon grandifolium (Willd.) Sweet, endemic
 Abutilon grantii A.Meeuse, indigenous
 Abutilon guineense (Schumach.) Baker f. & Exell, indigenous
 Abutilon hirtum (Lam.) Sweet, indigenous
 Abutilon hirtum (Lam.) Sweet var. hirtum, indigenous
 Abutilon lauraster Hochr. indigenous
 Abutilon mauritianum (Jacq.) Medik. indigenous
 Abutilon mendoncae Baker f. accepted as Abutilon pycnodon Hochr. present
 Abutilon pictum (Gillies ex Hook. & Arn.) Walp. not indigenous, cultivated, naturalised
 Abutilon piloso-cinereum A.Meeuse, indigenous
 Abutilon pycnodon Hochr. indigenous
 Abutilon ramosum (Cav.) Guill. & Perr. indigenous
 Abutilon rehmannii Baker f. indigenous
 Abutilon sonneratianum (Cav.) Sweet, indigenous
 Abutilon theophrasti Medik. not indigenous, naturalised

Adansonia
Genus Adansonia:
 Adansonia digitata L. indigenous
 Adansonia kilima Pettigrew, K.L.Bell, Bhagw. Grinan, Jillani, Jean Mey. Wabuyele & C.E.Vickers, accepted as Adansonia digitata L. indigenous

Althaea
Genus Althea:
 Althaea ludwigii L. indigenous

Anisodontea
Genus Anisodontea:
 Anisodontea alexandri (Baker f.) Bates, endemic
 Anisodontea anomala (Link & Otto) Bates, endemic
 Anisodontea biflora (Desr.) Bates, endemic
 Anisodontea bryoniifolia (L.) Bates, endemic
 Anisodontea capensis (L.) Bates, endemic
 Anisodontea dissecta (Harv.) Bates, endemic
 Anisodontea elegans (Cav.) Bates, endemic
 Anisodontea fruticosa (P.J.Bergius) Bates, endemic
 Anisodontea gracilis Bates, endemic
 Anisodontea julii (Burch. ex DC.) Bates, indigenous
 Anisodontea julii (Burch. ex DC.) Bates subsp. julii, indigenous
 Anisodontea julii (Burch. ex DC.) Bates subsp. pannosa (Bolus) Bates, endemic
 Anisodontea julii (Burch. ex DC.) Bates subsp. prostrata (E.Mey. ex Turcz.) Bates, indigenous
 Anisodontea malvastroides (Baker f.) Bates, endemic
 Anisodontea procumbens (Harv.) Bates, endemic
 Anisodontea pseudocapensis Bates, endemic
 Anisodontea racemosa (Harv.) Bates, endemic
 Anisodontea reflexa (J.C.Wendl.) Bates, endemic
 Anisodontea scabrosa (L.) Bates, endemic
 Anisodontea setosa (Harv.) Bates, endemic
 Anisodontea theronii Bates, endemic
 Anisodontea triloba (Thunb.) Bates, endemic

Anoda
Genus Anoda:
 Anoda cristata (L.) Schltdl. not indigenous, naturalised

Azanza
Genus Azanza:
 Azanza garckeana (F.Hoffm.) Exell & Hillc. indigenous

Brachychiton
Genus Brachychiton:
 Brachychiton populneus (Schott & Endl.) R.Br. not indigenous, naturalised

Cienfuegosia
Genus Cienfuegosia:
 Cienfuegosia digitata Cav. indigenous
 Cienfuegosia gerrardii (Harv.) Hochr. indigenous
 Cienfuegosia hildebrandtii Garcke, indigenous

Cola
Genus Cola:
 Cola greenwayi Brenan, indigenous
 Cola greenwayi Brenan var. greenwayi, indigenous
 Cola natalensis Oliv. indigenous

Corchorus
Genus Corchorus:
 Corchorus argillicola M.J.Moeaha & P.J.D.Winter, indigenous
 Corchorus asplenifolius Burch. indigenous
 Corchorus confusus Wild, indigenous
 Corchorus junodii (Schinz) N.E.Br. indigenous
 Corchorus kirkii N.E.Br. indigenous
 Corchorus longipedunculatus Mast. indigenous
 Corchorus olitorius L. not indigenous, naturalised
 Corchorus olitorius L. var. olitorius, not indigenous, naturalised
 Corchorus pinnatipartitus Wild, indigenous
 Corchorus psammophilus Codd, indigenous
 Corchorus schimperi Cufod. indigenous
 Corchorus sulcatus I.Verd. endemic
 Corchorus tridens L. not indigenous, naturalised
 Corchorus trilocularis L. not indigenous, cultivated, naturalised
 Corchorus velutinus Wild, indigenous

Dombeya
Genus Dombeya:
 Dombeya autumnalis I.Verd. endemic
 Dombeya burgessiae Gerrard ex Harv. indigenous
 Dombeya cymosa Harv. indigenous
 Dombeya kirkii Mast. indigenous
 Dombeya pulchra N.E.Br. indigenous
 Dombeya rotundifolia (Hochst.) Planch. var. rotundifolia, indigenous
 Dombeya tiliacea (Endl.) Planch. endemic

Gossypioides
Genus Gossypioides:
 Gossypioides kirkii (Mast.) J.B.Hutch. indigenous

Gossypium
Genus Gossypium:
 Gossypium herbaceum L. indigenous
 Gossypium herbaceum L. subsp. africanum (Watt) Vollesen, indigenous

Grewia
Genus Grewia:
 Grewia avellana Hiern, indigenous
 Grewia bicolor Juss. indigenous
 Grewia bicolor Juss. var. bicolor, indigenous
 Grewia caffra Meisn. indigenous
 Grewia flava DC. indigenous
 Grewia flavescens Juss. indigenous
 Grewia flavescens Juss. var. olukondae (Schinz) Wild, accepted as Grewia olukondae Schinz, indigenous
 Grewia gracillima Wild, indigenous
 Grewia hexamita Burret, indigenous
 Grewia hispida Harv. endemic
 Grewia hornbyi Wild, indigenous
 Grewia inaequilatera Garcke, indigenous
 Grewia lasiocarpa E.Mey. ex Harv. endemic
 Grewia microthyrsa K.Schum. ex Burret, indigenous
 Grewia monticola Sond. indigenous
 Grewia occidentalis L. indigenous
 Grewia occidentalis L. var. occidentalis, indigenous
 Grewia olukondae Schinz, indigenous
 Grewia pondoensis Burret, endemic
 Grewia retinervis Burret, indigenous
 Grewia robusta Burch. endemic
 Grewia rogersii Burtt Davy & Greenway, endemic
 Grewia subspathulata N.E.Br. indigenous
 Grewia sulcata Mast. indigenous
 Grewia sulcata Mast. var. sulcata, indigenous
 Grewia tenax (Forssk.) Fiori, indigenous
 Grewia tenax (Forssk.) Fiori var. tenax, accepted as Grewia tenax (Forssk.) Fiori, indigenous
 Grewia vernicosa Schinz, endemic
 Grewia villosa Willd. indigenous
 Grewia villosa Willd. var. villosa, indigenous

Hermannia
Genus Hermannia:
 Hermannia abrotanoides Schrad. indigenous
 Hermannia affinis K.Schum. indigenous
 Hermannia alnifolia L. endemic
 Hermannia althaeifolia L. endemic
 Hermannia althaeoides Link, endemic
 Hermannia amoena Dinter ex Friedr.-Holzh. indigenous
 Hermannia angularis Jacq. endemic
 Hermannia antonii I.Verd. endemic
 Hermannia aspera J.C.Wendl. endemic
 Hermannia auricoma (Szyszyl.) K.Schum. indigenous
 Hermannia bicolor Engl. & Dinter, indigenous
 Hermannia boraginiflora Hook. indigenous
 Hermannia brachymalla K.Schum. endemic
 Hermannia bryoniifolia Burch. endemic
 Hermannia burchellii (Sweet) I.Verd. indigenous
 Hermannia burkei Burtt Davy, indigenous
 Hermannia cernua Thunb. indigenous
 Hermannia coccocarpa (Eckl. & Zeyh.) Kuntze, indigenous
 Hermannia comosa Burch. ex DC. indigenous
 Hermannia concinnifolia I.Verd. endemic
 Hermannia confusa T.M.Salter, endemic
 Hermannia conglomerata Eckl. & Zeyh. endemic
 Hermannia cordata (E.Mey. ex E.Phillips) De Winter, endemic
 Hermannia cordifolia Harv. endemic
 Hermannia cristata Bolus, indigenous
 Hermannia cuneifolia Jacq. indigenous
 Hermannia cuneifolia Jacq. var. cuneifolia, indigenous
 Hermannia cuneifolia Jacq. var. glabrescens (Harv.) I.Verd. indigenous
 Hermannia damarana Baker f. indigenous
 Hermannia decipiens E.Mey. ex Harv. endemic
 Hermannia decumbens Willd. ex Spreng. endemic
 Hermannia denudata L.f. indigenous
 Hermannia denudata L.f. var. denudata, endemic
 Hermannia denudata L.f. var. erecta (N.E.Br.) Burtt Davy & Greenway, endemic
 Hermannia depressa N.E.Br. indigenous
 Hermannia desertorum Eckl. & Zeyh. indigenous
 Hermannia diffusa L.f. indigenous
 Hermannia disermifolia Jacq. indigenous
 Hermannia disticha Schrad. endemic
 Hermannia diversistipula C.Presl ex Harv. indigenous
 Hermannia diversistipula C.Presl ex Harv. var. diversistipula, indigenous
 Hermannia diversistipula C.Presl ex Harv. var. graciliflora I.Verd. endemic
 Hermannia eenii Baker f. indigenous
 Hermannia ernesti-ruschii Dinter ex Friedr.-Holzh. indigenous
 Hermannia erodioides (Burch. ex DC.) Kuntze, indigenous
 Hermannia filifolia L.f. indigenous
 Hermannia filifolia L.f. var. filifolia, endemic
 Hermannia filifolia L.f. var. grandicalyx I.Verd. endemic
 Hermannia filifolia L.f. var. robusta I.Verd. endemic
 Hermannia flammea Jacq. endemic
 Hermannia flammula Harv. endemic
 Hermannia floribunda Harv. indigenous
 Hermannia fruticulosa K.Schum. indigenous
 Hermannia gariepina Eckl. & Zeyh. indigenous
 Hermannia geniculata Eckl. & Zeyh. indigenous
 Hermannia gerrardii Harv. indigenous
 Hermannia glabrata L.f. endemic
 Hermannia glanduligera K.Schum. indigenous
 Hermannia gracilis Eckl. & Zeyh. endemic
 Hermannia grandiflora Aiton, indigenous
 Hermannia grandifolia N.E.Br. indigenous
 Hermannia grandistipula (Buchinger ex Hochst.) K.Schum. indigenous
 Hermannia grisea Schinz, endemic
 Hermannia grossularifolia L. endemic
 Hermannia helianthemum K.Schum. indigenous
 Hermannia helicoidea I.Verd. endemic
 Hermannia heterophylla (Cav.) Thunb. endemic
 Hermannia hispidula Rchb.f. endemic
 Hermannia holosericea Jacq. endemic
 Hermannia hyssopifolia L. endemic
 Hermannia incana Cav. endemic
 Hermannia involucrata Cav. endemic
 Hermannia jacobeifolia (Turcz.) R.A.Dyer, indigenous
 Hermannia johanssenii N.E.Br. endemic
 Hermannia joubertiana Harv. endemic
 Hermannia lacera (E.Mey. ex Harv.) Fourc. endemic
 Hermannia lancifolia Szyszyl. endemic
 Hermannia lavandulifolia L. endemic
 Hermannia leucantha Schltdl. indigenous
 Hermannia linearifolia Harv. endemic
 Hermannia linifolia Burm.f. endemic
 Hermannia linnaeoides (Burch.) K.Schum. indigenous
 Hermannia litoralis I.Verd. endemic
 Hermannia macra Schltr. indigenous
 Hermannia malvifolia N.E.Br. endemic
 Hermannia marginata (Turcz.) Pillans, endemic
 Hermannia micrantha Adamson, endemic
 Hermannia micropetala Harv. indigenous
 Hermannia minutiflora Engl. indigenous
 Hermannia modesta (Ehrenb.) Mast. indigenous
 Hermannia montana N.E.Br. endemic
 Hermannia mucronulata Turcz. endemic
 Hermannia muirii Pillans, endemic
 Hermannia multiflora Jacq. endemic
 Hermannia muricata Eckl. & Zeyh. endemic
 Hermannia nana (Eckl. & Zeyh.) Hochr. indigenous
 Hermannia oblongifolia (Harv.) Hochr. endemic
 Hermannia odorata Aiton, endemic
 Hermannia oligosperma K.Schum. indigenous
 Hermannia parviflora Eckl. & Zeyh. indigenous
 Hermannia parvula Burtt Davy, indigenous
 Hermannia paucifolia Turcz. indigenous
 Hermannia pfeilii K.Schum. indigenous
 Hermannia pillansii Compton, endemic
 Hermannia pinnata L. endemic
 Hermannia prismatocarpa E.Mey. ex Harv. endemic
 Hermannia procumbens Cav. indigenous
 Hermannia procumbens Cav. subsp. myrrhifolia (Thunb.) De Winter, endemic
 Hermannia procumbens Cav. subsp. procumbens, endemic
 Hermannia pulchella L.f. indigenous
 Hermannia pulverata Andrews, endemic
 Hermannia quartiniana A.Rich. indigenous
 Hermannia rautanenii Schinz ex K.Schum. indigenous
 Hermannia repetenda I.Verd. endemic
 Hermannia rigida Harv. endemic
 Hermannia rudis N.E.Br. endemic
 Hermannia rugosa Adamson, endemic
 Hermannia saccifera (Turcz.) K.Schum. endemic
 Hermannia salviifolia L.f. indigenous
 Hermannia salviifolia L.f. var. grandistipula Harv. endemic
 Hermannia salviifolia L.f. var. oblonga Harv. endemic
 Hermannia salviifolia L.f. var. salviifolia, endemic
 Hermannia sandersonii Harv. endemic
 Hermannia scabra Cav. endemic
 Hermannia scabricaulis T.M.Salter, endemic
 Hermannia schlechteriana Schinz ex K.Schum. endemic
 Hermannia scordifolia Jacq. endemic
 Hermannia sisymbriifolia (Turcz.) Hochr. endemic
 Hermannia solaniflora K.Schum. indigenous
 Hermannia spinosa E.Mey. ex Harv. indigenous
 Hermannia staurostemon K.Schum. indigenous
 Hermannia stellulata (Harv.) K.Schum. indigenous
 Hermannia stipitata Pillans, indigenous
 Hermannia stipulacea Lehm. ex Eckl. & Zeyh. endemic
 Hermannia stricta (E.Mey. ex Turcz.) Harv. indigenous
 Hermannia suavis C.Presl ex Harv. endemic
 Hermannia sulcata Harv. endemic
 Hermannia ternifolia C.Presl ex Harv. endemic
 Hermannia tomentosa (Turcz.) Schinz ex Engl. indigenous
 Hermannia transvaalensis Schinz, endemic
 Hermannia trifoliata L. endemic
 Hermannia trifurca L. indigenous
 Hermannia umbratica I.Verd. endemic
 Hermannia velutina DC. indigenous
 Hermannia veronicifolia (Eckl. & Zeyh.) Hochr. endemic
 Hermannia vestita Thunb. indigenous
 Hermannia violacea (Burch. ex DC.) K.Schum. endemic
 Hermannia woodii Schinz, indigenous

Hibiscus
Genus Hibiscus:
 Hibiscus aethiopicus L. indigenous
 Hibiscus aethiopicus L. var. aethiopicus, indigenous
 Hibiscus aethiopicus L. var. angustifolius (Eckl. & Zeyh.) Exell, endemic
 Hibiscus aethiopicus L. var. ovatus Harv. indigenous
 Hibiscus altissimus Hornby, indigenous
 Hibiscus aridus R.A.Dyer, endemic
 Hibiscus barbosae Exell, indigenous
 Hibiscus barnardii Exell, endemic
 Hibiscus caesius Garcke, indigenous
 Hibiscus caesius Garcke var. caesius, indigenous
 Hibiscus calyphyllus Cav. indigenous
 Hibiscus cannabinus L. indigenous
 Hibiscus coddii Exell, endemic
 Hibiscus coddii Exell subsp. barnardii (Exell) Leistner & P.J.D.Winter, indigenous
 Hibiscus coddii Exell subsp. coddii, indigenous
 Hibiscus diversifolius Jacq. indigenous
 Hibiscus diversifolius Jacq. subsp. diversifolius, indigenous
 Hibiscus dongolensis Delile, indigenous
 Hibiscus elliottiae Harv. indigenous
 Hibiscus engleri K.Schum. indigenous
 Hibiscus ficulneus Cav. accepted as Hibiscus diversifolius Jacq. subsp. diversifolius 
 Hibiscus fleckii Gurke, indigenous
 Hibiscus fuscus Garcke, indigenous
 Hibiscus ludwigii Eckl. & Zeyh. indigenous
 Hibiscus lunarifolius Willd. indigenous
 Hibiscus marlothianus K.Schum. endemic
 Hibiscus mastersianus Hiern, not indigenous, naturalised
 Hibiscus meeusei Exell, accepted as Hibiscus nigricaulis Baker f. present
 Hibiscus meyeri Harv. indigenous
 Hibiscus meyeri Harv. subsp. meyeri, indigenous
 Hibiscus meyeri Harv. subsp. transvaalensis (Exell) Exell, endemic
 Hibiscus micranthus L.f. indigenous
 Hibiscus micranthus L.f. var. micranthus, indigenous
 Hibiscus microcarpus Garcke, indigenous
 Hibiscus mutabilis L. not indigenous, naturalised
 Hibiscus mutatus N.E.Br. indigenous
 Hibiscus nigricaulis Baker f. indigenous
 Hibiscus palmatus Forssk. indigenous
 Hibiscus pedunculatus L.f. indigenous
 Hibiscus physaloides Guill. & Perr. indigenous
 Hibiscus platycalyx Mast. indigenous
 Hibiscus praeteritus R.A.Dyer, indigenous
 Hibiscus pusillus Thunb. indigenous
 Hibiscus sabdariffa L. [1], not indigenous, naturalised
 Hibiscus sabiensis Exell, indigenous
 Hibiscus saxatilis J.M.Wood & M.S.Evans, indigenous
 Hibiscus schinzii Gurke [2], indigenous
 Hibiscus sidiformis Baill. indigenous
 Hibiscus subreniformis Burtt Davy, indigenous
 Hibiscus surattensis L. indigenous
 Hibiscus syriaca L. not indigenous, naturalised
 Hibiscus tiliaceus L. indigenous
 Hibiscus tiliaceus L. subsp. tiliaceus, indigenous
 Hibiscus trionum L. not indigenous, naturalised
 Hibiscus upingtoniae Gurke, indigenous
 Hibiscus vitifolius L. indigenous
 Hibiscus vitifolius L. subsp. vitifolius, indigenous
 Hibiscus vitifolius L. subsp. vulgaris Brenan & Exell, indigenous
 Hibiscus waterbergensis Exell, endemic

Lagunaria
Genus Lagunaria:
 Lagunaria patersonia (Andrews) G.Don, not indigenous, naturalised

Lavatera
Genus Lavatera:
 Lavatera arborea L. accepted as Malva arborea (L.) Webb & Berthel. [1], not indigenous, naturalised
 Lavatera assurgentiflora Kellogg, accepted as Malva assurgentiflora (Kellogg) M.F.Ray, not indigenous, naturalised
 Lavatera cretica L. accepted as Malva multiflora (Cav.) Soldano, Banfi & Gallaso, not indigenous, naturalised
 Lavatera trimestris L. not indigenous, naturalised

Malva
Genus Malva:
 Malva aegyptia L. not indigenous, naturalised
 Malva arborea (L.) Webb & Berthel. [1], not indigenous, naturalised, invasive
 Malva dendromorpha M.F.Ray, accepted as Malva arborea (L.) Webb & Berthel. [1], not indigenous, naturalised, invasive
 Malva multiflora (Cav.) Soldano, Banfi & Gallaso, not indigenous, naturalised, invasive
 Malva neglecta Wallr. not indigenous, naturalised
 Malva parviflora L. not indigenous, naturalised
 Malva parviflora L. var. parviflora, not indigenous, naturalised
 Malva pseudolavatera M.F.Ray, accepted as Malva multiflora (Cav.) Soldano, Banfi & Gallaso 
 Malva pusilla Sm. not indigenous, naturalised
 Malva sylvestris L. not indigenous, naturalised
 Malva verticillata L. not indigenous, naturalised, invasive
 Malva verticillata L. var. crispa L. not indigenous, naturalised
 Malva verticillata L. var. verticillata, not indigenous, naturalised

Malvastrum
Genus Malvastrum:
 Malvastrum coromandelianum (L.) Garcke, not indigenous, naturalised, invasive

Malvaviscus
Genus Malvaviscus:
 Malvaviscus penduliflorus Sesse & MoÃ§. ex DC. not indigenous, cultivated, naturalised, invasive

Melhania
Genus Melhania:
 Melhania acuminata Mast. indigenous
 Melhania acuminata Mast. var. acuminata, indigenous
 Melhania acuminata Mast. var. agnosta (K.Schum.) Wild, indigenous
 Melhania burchellii DC. indigenous
 Melhania damarana Harv. indigenous
 Melhania didyma Eckl. & Zeyh. indigenous
 Melhania forbesii Planch. ex Mast. indigenous
 Melhania integra I.Verd. endemic
 Melhania polygama I.Verd. endemic
 Melhania prostrata DC. indigenous
 Melhania randii Baker f. indigenous
 Melhania rehmannii Szyszyl. indigenous
 Melhania suluensis Gerstner, indigenous
 Melhania transvaalensis Szyszyl. endemic
 Melhania virescens (K.Schum.) K.Schum. indigenous

Modiola
Genus Modiola:
 Modiola caroliniana (L.) G.Don, not indigenous, naturalised

Pavonia
Genus Pavonia:
 Pavonia burchellii (DC.) R.A.Dyer, indigenous
 Pavonia clathrata Mast. indigenous
 Pavonia columella Cav. indigenous
 Pavonia dentata Burtt Davy, endemic
 Pavonia dregei Garcke, endemic
 Pavonia elegans Garcke, endemic
 Pavonia leptocalyx (Sond.) Ulbr. indigenous
 Pavonia praemorsa (L.f.) Cav. endemic
 Pavonia senegalensis (Cav.) Leistner, indigenous
 Pavonia transvaalensis (Ulbr.) A.Meeuse, endemic
 Pavonia urens Cav. indigenous
 Pavonia urens Cav. var. urens, endemic

Radyera
Genus Radyera:
 Radyera urens (L.f.) Bullock, indigenous

Sida
Genus Sida:
 Sida acuta Burm.f. indigenous
 Sida acuta Burm.f. subsp. acuta, indigenous
 Sida alba L. indigenous
 Sida chrysantha Ulbr. indigenous
 Sida cordifolia L. indigenous
 Sida cordifolia L. subsp. cordifolia, indigenous
 Sida dregei Burtt Davy, indigenous
 Sida ovata Forssk. indigenous
 Sida pseudocordifolia Hochr. indigenous
 Sida rhombifolia L. indigenous
 Sida rhombifolia L. subsp. rhombifolia, indigenous
 Sida serratifolia R.Wilczek & Steyaert, indigenous
 Sida spinosa L. indigenous
 Sida spinosa L. var. spinosa, indigenous
 Sida ternata L.f. indigenous

Sparrmannia
Genus Sparrmannia:
 Sparrmannia africana L.f. endemic
 Sparrmannia ricinocarpa (Eckl. & Zeyh.) Kuntze, indigenous

Sphaeralcea
Genus Sphaeralcea:
 Sphaeralcea bonariensis (Cav.) Griseb. not indigenous, naturalised

Sterculia
Genus Sterculia:
 Sterculia alexandri Harv. endemic
 Sterculia murex Hemsl. endemic
 Sterculia rogersii N.E.Br. indigenous

Thespesia
Genus Thespesia:
 Thespesia acutiloba (Baker f.) Exell & MendonÃ§a, indigenous

Triumfetta
Genus Triumfetta:
 Triumfetta angolensis Sprague & Hutch. indigenous
 Triumfetta annua L. indigenous
 Triumfetta annua L. forma annua, indigenous
 Triumfetta annua L. forma piligera Sprague & Hutch. indigenous
 Triumfetta dekindtiana Engl. indigenous
 Triumfetta obtusicornis Sprague & Hutch. endemic
 Triumfetta pentandra A.Rich. indigenous
 Triumfetta pentandra A.Rich. var. pentandra, indigenous
 Triumfetta pilosa Roth, indigenous
 Triumfetta pilosa Roth var. effusa (E.Mey. ex Harv.) Wild, indigenous
 Triumfetta pilosa Roth var. pilosa, endemic
 Triumfetta pilosa Roth var. tomentosa Szyszyl. ex Sprague & Hutch. indigenous
 Triumfetta rhomboidea Jacq. indigenous
 Triumfetta rhomboidea Jacq. var. rhomboidea, indigenous
 Triumfetta sonderi Ficalho & Hiern, endemic
 Triumfetta welwitschii Mast. indigenous
 Triumfetta welwitschii Mast. var. hirsuta (Sprague & Hutch.) Wild, indigenous
 Triumfetta welwitschii Mast. var. welwitschii, indigenous

Urena
Genus Urena:
 Urena lobata L. not indigenous, naturalised
 Urena lobata L. subsp. lobata var. lobata, not indigenous, naturalised

Waltheria
Genus Waltheria:
 Waltheria indica L. indigenous

Wissadula
Genus Wissadula:
 Wissadula rostrata (Schumach.) Hook.f. indigenous

Neuradaceae
 Family: Neuradaceae,

Grielum
Genus Grielum:
 Grielum cuneifolium Schinz, indigenous
 Grielum grandiflorum (L.) Druce, endemic
 Grielum humifusum Thunb. indigenous
 Grielum humifusum Thunb. var. humifusum, indigenous
 Grielum humifusum Thunb. var. parviflorum Harv. indigenous
 Grielum sinuatum Licht. ex Burch. indigenous

Neuradopsis
Genus Neuradopsis:
 Neuradopsis austro-africana (Schinz) Bremek. & Oberm. indigenous
 Neuradopsis bechuanensis Bremek. & Schweick. indigenous

Thymelaeaceae
 Family: Thymelaeaceae,

Arthrosolen
Genus Arthrosolen:
 Arthrosolen calocephalus (Meisn.) C.A.Mey. accepted as Lasiosiphon calocephalus (Meisn.) Domke, indigenous
 Arthrosolen microcephalus (Meisn.) E.Phillips [2], accepted as Lasiosiphon microcephalus (Meisn.) J.C.Manning & Magee, indigenous

Cryptadenia
Genus Cryptadenia:
 breviflora Meisn. accepted as Lachnaea grandiflora (L.f.) Baill. present
 Cryptadenia filicaulis Meisn. accepted as Lachnaea filicaulis (Meisn.) Beyers, present
 Cryptadenia grandiflora (L.f.) Meisn. accepted as Lachnaea grandiflora (L.f.) Baill. present
 Cryptadenia laxa C.H.Wright, accepted as Lachnaea laxa (C.H.Wright) Beyers, present
 Cryptadenia uniflora (L.) Meisn. accepted as Lachnaea uniflora (L.) Crantz, present

Dais
Genus Dais:
 Dais cotinifolia L. indigenous

Englerodaphne
Genus Englerodaphne:
 Englerodaphne ovalifolia (Meisn.) E.Phillips, indigenous
 Englerodaphne pilosa Burtt Davy, endemic
 Englerodaphne subcordata (Meisn.) Engl. indigenous

Gnidia
Genus Gnidia:
 Gnidia aberrans C.H.Wright, indigenous
 Gnidia albosericea Moss ex B.Peterson, accepted as Lasiosiphon ornatus Burtt Davy, indigenous
 Gnidia anomala Meisn. endemic
 Gnidia anthylloides (L.f.) Gilg, accepted as Lasiosiphon anthylloides (L.f.) Meisn. endemic
 Gnidia baurii C.H.Wright, endemic
 Gnidia burchellii (Meisn.) Gilg, accepted as Lasiosiphon burchellii Meisn. indigenous
 Gnidia burmannii Eckl. & Zeyh. ex Meisn. endemic
 Gnidia caffra (Meisn.) Gilg, accepted as Lasiosiphon caffer Meisn. indigenous
 Gnidia calocephala (Meisn.) Gilg, accepted as Lasiosiphon calocephalus (Meisn.) Domke, endemic
 Gnidia caniflora Meisn. endemic
 Gnidia canoargentea (C.H.Wright) Gilg, accepted as Lasiosiphon canoargenteus C.H.Wright, endemic
 Gnidia capitata L.f. accepted as Lasiosiphon capitatus (L.f.) Burtt Davy, indigenous
 Gnidia cayleyi C.H.Wright, endemic
 Gnidia chrysophylla Meisn. endemic
 Gnidia clavata Schinz, endemic
 Gnidia compacta (C.H.Wright) J.H.Ross, indigenous
 Gnidia conspicua Meisn. endemic
 Gnidia coriacea Meisn. endemic
 Gnidia cuneata Meisn. accepted as Lasiosiphon meisnerianus Endl. endemic
 Gnidia decurrens Meisn. endemic
 Gnidia denudata Lindl. endemic
 Gnidia deserticola Gilg, accepted as Lasiosiphon deserticola (Gilg) C.H.Wright, endemic
 Gnidia dregeana Meisn. accepted as Lasiosiphon dregeanus (Meisn.) Endl. endemic
 Gnidia ericoides C.H.Wright, endemic
 Gnidia fastigiata Rendle, indigenous
 Gnidia flanaganii C.H.Wright, endemic
 Gnidia francisci Bolus, endemic
 Gnidia fraterna (N.E.Br.) E.Phillips, endemic
 Gnidia galpinii C.H.Wright, endemic
 Gnidia geminiflora E.Mey. ex Meisn. endemic
 Gnidia gymnostachya (C.A.Mey.) Gilg, indigenous
 Gnidia harveyiana Meisn. endemic
 Gnidia humilis Meisn. endemic
 Gnidia imbricata L.f. endemic
 Gnidia inconspicua Meisn. endemic
 Gnidia insignis Compton, endemic
 Gnidia juniperifolia Lam. endemic
 Gnidia kraussiana Meisn. accepted as Lasiosiphon kraussianus (Meisn.) Meisn. [1], indigenous
 Gnidia laxa (L.f.) Gilg, endemic
 Gnidia leipoldtii C.H.Wright, endemic
 Gnidia linearifolia (Wikstr.) B.Peterson, endemic
 Gnidia linoides Wikstr. endemic
 Gnidia lucens Lam. endemic
 Gnidia macropetala Meisn. accepted as Lasiosiphon macropetalus (Meisn.) Meisn. endemic
 Gnidia meyeri Meisn. endemic
 Gnidia microcephala Meisn. accepted as Lasiosiphon microcephalus (Meisn.) J.C.Manning & Magee, indigenous
 Gnidia microphylla Meisn. accepted as Lasiosiphon microphyllus (Meisn.) Meisn. endemic
 Gnidia myrtifolia C.H.Wright, endemic
 Gnidia nana (L.f.) Wikstr. endemic
 Gnidia nitida Bolus, endemic
 Gnidia nodiflora Meisn. indigenous
 Gnidia obtusissima Meisn. endemic
 Gnidia oppositifolia L. endemic
 Gnidia orbiculata C.H.Wright, endemic
 Gnidia ornata (Meisn.) Gilg, endemic
 Gnidia pallida Meisn. endemic
 Gnidia parviflora Meisn. endemic
 Gnidia parvula Wolley-Dod, endemic
 Gnidia pedunculata Beyers, endemic
 Gnidia penicillata Licht. ex Meisn. endemic
 Gnidia phaeotricha Gilg, endemic
 Gnidia pinifolia L. endemic
 Gnidia polyantha Gilg, accepted as Lasiosiphon polyanthus (Gilg) C.H.Wright, endemic
 Gnidia polycephala (C.A.Mey.) Gilg, accepted as Lasiosiphon polycephalus (E.Mey. ex Meisn.) H.Pearson, indigenous
 Gnidia polystachya P.J.Bergius var. congesta C.H.Wright, accepted as Gnidia squarrosa (L.) Druce, present
 Gnidia polystachya P.J.Bergius var. polystachya, accepted as Gnidia squarrosa (L.) Druce, present
 Gnidia propinqua (Hilliard) B.Peterson, indigenous
 Gnidia pulchella Meisn. accepted as Lasiosiphon pulchellus (Meisn.) Decne. endemic
 Gnidia quadrifaria C.H.Wright, accepted as Gnidia styphelioides Meisn. present
 Gnidia racemosa Thunb. endemic
 Gnidia renniana Hilliard & B.L.Burtt, endemic
 Gnidia robusta B.Peterson, accepted as Lasiosiphon nanus Burtt Davy, indigenous
 Gnidia rubescens B.Peterson, accepted as Lasiosiphon rubescens (B.Peterson) J.C.Manning & Magee, indigenous
 Gnidia scabra Thunb. endemic
 Gnidia scabrida Meisn. endemic
 Gnidia sericea L. indigenous
 Gnidia sericea L. var. hirsuta Meisn. endemic
 Gnidia sericea L. var. sericea, endemic
 Gnidia sericocephala (Meisn.) Gilg ex Engl. indigenous
 Gnidia setosa Wikstr. endemic
 Gnidia similis C.H.Wright, endemic
 Gnidia simplex L. endemic
 Gnidia sonderiana Meisn. endemic
 Gnidia sparsiflora Bartl. ex Meisn. endemic
 Gnidia spicata (L.f.) Gilg, endemic
 Gnidia splendens Meisn. accepted as Lasiosiphon splendens (Meisn.) Endl. indigenous
 Gnidia squarrosa (L.) Druce, indigenous
 Gnidia stellatifolia Gand. endemic
 Gnidia strigillosa Meisn. endemic
 Gnidia styphelioides Meisn. endemic
 Gnidia suavissima Dinter, accepted as Lasiosiphon suavissimus (Dinter) Domke, indigenous
 Gnidia subcordata Meisn. accepted as Englerodaphne subcordata (Meisn.) Engl. indigenous
 Gnidia subulata Lam. endemic
 Gnidia tenella Meisn. endemic
 Gnidia thesioides Meisn. indigenous
 Gnidia thesioides Meisn. var. condensata Meisn. endemic
 Gnidia thesioides Meisn. var. laxa Meisn. endemic
 Gnidia thesioides Meisn. var. thesioides, endemic
 Gnidia tomentosa L. endemic
 Gnidia triplinervis Meisn. accepted as Lasiosiphon triplinervis (Meisn.) Decne. endemic
 Gnidia variabilis (C.H.Wright) E.Phillips, endemic
 Gnidia variegata Gand. endemic
 Gnidia vesiculosa Eckl. & Zeyh. accepted as Gnidia ornata (Meisn.) Gilg, present
 Gnidia wikstroemiana Meisn. endemic
 Gnidia wilmsii (C.H.Wright) Engl. accepted as Lasiosiphon wilmsii C.H.Wright, endemic
 Gnidia woodii C.H.Wright, indigenous

Lachnaea
Genus Lachnaea:
 Lachnaea alpina (Eckl. & Zeyh.) Meisn. endemic
 Lachnaea ambigua Meisn. var. ambigua, accepted as Lachnaea nervosa (Thunb.) Meisn. present
 Lachnaea ambigua Meisn. var. minor Meisn. accepted as Lachnaea nervosa (Thunb.) Meisn. present
 Lachnaea aurea (Eckl. & Zeyh.) Meisn. endemic
 Lachnaea axillaris Meisn. endemic
 Lachnaea burchellii Meisn. endemic
 Lachnaea buxifolia Lam. accepted as Lachnaea pomposa Beyers, present
 Lachnaea capitata (L.) Crantz, endemic
 Lachnaea densiflora Meisn. endemic
 Lachnaea diosmoides Meisn. endemic
 Lachnaea diosmoides Meisn. var. tenella Meisn. accepted as Lachnaea diosmoides Meisn. present
 Lachnaea dubia Gand. accepted as Gnidia laxa (L.f.) Gilg, present
 Lachnaea elegans Compton, accepted as Lachnaea striata (Poir.) Meisn. present
 Lachnaea elsieae Beyers, endemic
 Lachnaea ericoides Meisn. endemic
 Lachnaea eriocephala L. endemic
 Lachnaea filamentosa Meisn. endemic
 Lachnaea filamentosa Meisn. var. major Meisn. accepted as Lachnaea filamentosa Meisn. present
 Lachnaea filicaulis (Meisn.) Beyers, endemic
 Lachnaea funicaulis Schinz, endemic
 Lachnaea globulifera Meisn. indigenous
 Lachnaea globulifera Meisn. subsp. globulifera, endemic
 Lachnaea globulifera Meisn. subsp. incana Beyers, endemic
 Lachnaea globulifera Meisn. var. coerulescens Eckl. & Zeyh. accepted as Lachnaea globulifera Meisn. subsp. incana Beyers, present
 Lachnaea glomerata Fourc. endemic
 Lachnaea gracilis Meisn. endemic
 Lachnaea grandiflora (L.f.) Baill. endemic
 Lachnaea greytonensis Beyers, endemic
 Lachnaea laniflora (C.H.Wright) Bond, endemic
 Lachnaea laxa (C.H.Wright) Beyers, endemic
 Lachnaea leipoldtii Beyers, endemic
 Lachnaea macrantha Meisn. endemic
 Lachnaea marlothii Schltr. endemic
 Lachnaea micrantha Schltr. accepted as Lachnaea axillaris Meisn. present
 Lachnaea montana Beyers, endemic
 Lachnaea naviculifolia Compton, endemic
 Lachnaea nervosa (Thunb.) Meisn. endemic
 Lachnaea oliverorum Beyers, endemic
 Lachnaea passerinoides N.E.Br. accepted as Lachnaea penicillata Meisn. present
 Lachnaea pedicellata Beyers, endemic
 Lachnaea pendula Beyers, endemic
 Lachnaea penicillata Meisn. endemic
 Lachnaea pomposa Beyers, endemic
 Lachnaea pudens Beyers, endemic
 Lachnaea purpurea Andrews, accepted as Lachnaea eriocephala L. present
 Lachnaea pusilla Beyers, endemic
 Lachnaea rupestris Beyers, endemic
 Lachnaea ruscifolia Compton, endemic
 Lachnaea sociorum Beyers, endemic
 Lachnaea stokoei Beyers, endemic
 Lachnaea striata (Poir.) Meisn. endemic
 Lachnaea uniflora (L.) Crantz, endemic
 Lachnaea villosa Beyers, endemic

Lasiosiphon
Genus Lasiosiphon:
 Lasiosiphon anthylloides (L.f.) Meisn. endemic
 Lasiosiphon burchellii Meisn. indigenous
 Lasiosiphon caffer Meisn. indigenous
 Lasiosiphon calocephalus (Meisn.) Domke, endemic
 Lasiosiphon canoargenteus C.H.Wright, endemic
 Lasiosiphon capitatus (L.f.) Burtt Davy, indigenous
 Lasiosiphon deserticola (Gilg) C.H.Wright, endemic
 Lasiosiphon dregeanus (Meisn.) Endl. endemic
 Lasiosiphon esterhuyseniae Magee & J.C.Manning, endemic
 Lasiosiphon kraussianus (Meisn.) Burtt Davy, accepted as Lasiosiphon kraussianus (Meisn.) Meisn. indigenous
 Lasiosiphon kraussianus (Meisn.) Meisn. indigenous
 Lasiosiphon kraussianus (Meisn.) Meisn. var. kraussianus, indigenous
 Lasiosiphon macropetalus (Meisn.) Meisn. endemic
 Lasiosiphon meisnerianus Endl. endemic
 Lasiosiphon microcephalus (Meisn.) J.C.Manning & Magee, indigenous
 Lasiosiphon microphyllus (Meisn.) Meisn. endemic
 Lasiosiphon nanus Burtt Davy, indigenous
 Lasiosiphon ornatus Burtt Davy, indigenous
 Lasiosiphon pedunculatus (Beyers) J.C.Manning & Boatwr. endemic
 Lasiosiphon polyanthus (Gilg) C.H.Wright, endemic
 Lasiosiphon polyanthus (Gilg) C.H.Wright var. microcalyx Burtt Davy, endemic
 Lasiosiphon polyanthus (Gilg) C.H.Wright var. polyanthus, endemic
 Lasiosiphon polycephalus (E.Mey. ex Meisn.) H.Pearson, indigenous
 Lasiosiphon pulchellus (Meisn.) Decne. endemic
 Lasiosiphon rigidus J.C.Manning & Boatwr. endemic
 Lasiosiphon rubescens (B.Peterson) J.C.Manning & Magee, indigenous
 Lasiosiphon sericocephalus (Meisn.) J.C.Manning & Boatwr. indigenous
 Lasiosiphon similis C.H.Wright, indigenous
 Lasiosiphon splendens (Meisn.) Endl. indigenous
 Lasiosiphon suavissimus (Dinter) Domke, indigenous
 Lasiosiphon triplinervis (Meisn.) Decne. endemic
 Lasiosiphon wilmsii C.H.Wright, endemic

Passerina
Genus Passerina:
 Passerina burchellii Thoday, endemic
 Passerina comosa (Meisn.) C.H.Wright, endemic
 Passerina corymbosa Eckl. ex C.H.Wright, endemic
 Passerina drakensbergensis Hilliard & B.L.Burtt, endemic
 Passerina ericoides L. endemic
 Passerina esterhuyseniae Bredenk. & A.E.van Wyk, endemic
 Passerina falcifolia (Meisn.) C.H.Wright, endemic
 Passerina filiformis L. indigenous
 Passerina filiformis L. subsp. filiformis, endemic
 Passerina filiformis L. subsp. glutinosa (Thoday) Bredenk. & A.E.van Wyk, endemic
 Passerina filiformis L. var. glutinosa Thoday, accepted as Passerina filiformis L. subsp. glutinosa (Thoday) Bredenk. & A.E.van Wyk, present
 Passerina galpinii C.H.Wright, endemic
 Passerina globosa Lam. accepted as Brunia squalida E.Mey. ex Sond. endemic
 Passerina glomerata Thunb. accepted as Passerina truncata (Meisn.) Bredenk. & A.E.van Wyk subsp. truncata, present
 Passerina grandiflora L.f. accepted as Lachnaea grandiflora (L.f.) Baill. present
 Passerina montana Thoday, indigenous
 Passerina montivaga Bredenk. & A.E.van Wyk, indigenous
 Passerina montivagus Bredenk. & A.E.van Wyk, accepted as Passerina montivaga Bredenk. & A.E.van Wyk, present
 Passerina nivicola Bredenk. & A.E.van Wyk, endemic
 Passerina obtusifolia Thoday, endemic
 Passerina paleacea Wikstr. endemic
 Passerina paludosa Thoday, endemic
 Passerina pendula Eckl. & Zeyh. ex Thoday, endemic
 Passerina pentandra Thunb. accepted as Brunia pentandra (Thunb.) Class.-Bockh. & E.G.H.Oliv. endemic
 Passerina quadrifaria Bredenk. & A.E.van Wyk, endemic
 Passerina rigida Wikstr. endemic
 Passerina rubra C.H.Wright, endemic
 Passerina truncata (Meisn.) Bredenk. & A.E.van Wyk, indigenous
 Passerina truncata (Meisn.) Bredenk. & A.E.van Wyk subsp. monticola Bredenk. & A.E.van Wyk, endemic
 Passerina truncata (Meisn.) Bredenk. & A.E.van Wyk subsp. truncata, endemic
 Passerina uniflora L.f. accepted as Lachnaea uniflora (L.) Crantz, present
 Passerina vulgaris (Meisn.) Thoday, accepted as Passerina corymbosa Eckl. ex C.H.Wright, present

Peddiea
Genus Peddiea:
 Peddiea africana Harv. indigenous

Struthiola
Genus Struthiola:
 Struthiola angustifolia Lam. accepted as Struthiola ciliata (L.) Lam. present
 Struthiola angustiloba B.Peterson & Hilliard, endemic
 Struthiola anomala Hilliard, endemic
 Struthiola argentea Lehm. endemic
 Struthiola bachmanniana Gilg, endemic
 Struthiola cicatricosa C.H.Wright, endemic
 Struthiola ciliata (L.) Lam. endemic
 Struthiola concava S.Moore, endemic
 Struthiola confusa C.H.Wright, endemic
 Struthiola congesta C.H.Wright, accepted as Struthiola pondoensis Gilg ex C.H.Wright, present
 Struthiola dodecandra (L.) Druce, endemic
 Struthiola eckloniana Meisn. endemic
 Struthiola epacridioides C.H.Wright, accepted as Struthiola hirsuta Wikstr. present
 Struthiola ericoides C.H.Wright, endemic
 Struthiola fasciata C.H.Wright, endemic
 Struthiola flavescens Gilg ex C.H.Wright, accepted as Struthiola ciliata (L.) Lam. present
 Struthiola floribunda C.H.Wright, endemic
 Struthiola fourcadei Compton, accepted as Struthiola martiana Meisn. present
 Struthiola galpinii C.H.Wright, endemic
 Struthiola garciana C.H.Wright, endemic
 Struthiola hirsuta Wikstr. endemic
 Struthiola leptantha Bolus, endemic
 Struthiola lineariloba Meisn. endemic
 Struthiola longifolia C.H.Wright, endemic
 Struthiola lucens Lam. accepted as Struthiola ciliata (L.) Lam. present
 Struthiola macowanii C.H.Wright, endemic
 Struthiola martiana Meisn. endemic
 Struthiola mundii Eckl. ex Meisn. endemic
 Struthiola myrsinites Lam. endemic
 Struthiola parviflora Bartl. ex Meisn. endemic
 Struthiola pillansii Hutch. accepted as Struthiola ciliata (L.) Lam. present
 Struthiola pondoensis Gilg ex C.H.Wright, endemic
 Struthiola ramosa C.H.Wright, endemic
 Struthiola recta C.H.Wright, endemic
 Struthiola rigida Meisn. endemic
 Struthiola rustiana Gilg, accepted as Struthiola ciliata (L.) Lam. present
 Struthiola salteri Levyns, endemic
 Struthiola striata Lam. endemic
 Struthiola tetralepis Schltr. indigenous
 Struthiola tetralepis Schltr. var. glabricaulis Schltr. endemic
 Struthiola tetralepis Schltr. var. tetralepis, endemic
 Struthiola tomentosa Andrews, endemic
 Struthiola tuberculosa Lam. endemic

Synaptolepis
Genus Synaptolepis:
 Synaptolepis oliveriana Gilg, indigenous

References

South African plant biodiversity lists
Malvales